In polymer science Flory–Rehner equation is an equation that describes the mixing of polymer and liquid molecules as predicted by the equilibrium swelling theory of Flory and Rehner. 
It describes the equilibrium swelling of a lightly crosslinked polymer in terms of crosslink density and the quality of the solvent. 

The Flory–Rehner equation is written as:

In its full form, the Flory–Rehner equation is written as:

Flory–Rehner theory 

The Flory–Rehner theory gives the change of free energy upon swelling of the polymer gel similar to the Flory–Huggins solution theory:
.

The theory considers forces arising from three sources:
 The entropy change  caused by mixing of polymer and solvent
 The heat of mixing of polymer and solvent , which may be positive, negative, or zero so, that 
 The entropy change caused by reduction in numbers of possible chain conformations via swelling 

The Flory–Rehner equation was used to model the cooking of steaks in a journal article in 2020

References

Bibliography

Polymer physics
Soft matter
Materials science
Polymers
Equations
Rubber properties